Thout 19 - Coptic Calendar - Thout 21

The twentieth day of the Coptic month of Thout, the first month of the Coptic year. On a common year, this day corresponds to September 17, of the Julian Calendar, and September 30, of the Gregorian Calendar. This day falls in the Coptic season of Akhet, the season of inundation.

Commemorations

Saints 

 The martyrdom of Saint Melitina the Virgin 
 The departure of Pope Athanasius II, the twenty-eighth Patriarch of the See of Saint Mark 
 The departure of Saint Theopista

References 

Days of the Coptic calendar